Acanthomyrmex minus is a species of ant which is a part of the genus Acanthomyrmex. Terayam, Ito & Gobin described the species in 1998, and the species is native to Indonesia.

References

minus
Insects described in 1998
Insects of Indonesia